Margarita Gasparyan and Lyudmyla Kichenok were the defending champions, however both players chose not to participate. 

The top seeds, Jocelyn Rae and Anna Smith won the title, defeating wildcards Julie Coin and Mathilde Johansson in the final, 7–6(7–5), 7–6(7–2).

Seeds

Draw

References 
 Draw

Open GDF Suez Seine-et-Marne - Doubles